is a passenger railway station in the city of Tsukuba, Ibaraki Prefecture, Japan, operated by the third-sector railway operating company Metropolitan Intercity Railway Company. Its station number is TX17.

Line
Midorino Station is served by Tsukuba Express and is located 48.6 km from the official starting point of the line at Akihabara Station.

Station layout
The station consists of two opposed side platforms on a viaduct, with the station building located underneath.

Platforms

History
Midorino Station opened on 24 August 2005.

Passenger statistics
In fiscal 2019, the station was used by an average of 4846 passengers daily (boarding passengers only).

Surrounding area
National Agriculture and Food Research Organization
National Agricultural Research Center
National Food Research Institute
Agriculture, Forestry and Fisheries Research Council
National Institute for Agro-Environmental Sciences

See also
 List of railway stations in Japan

References

External links

  TX Midorino Station 

Railway stations in Ibaraki Prefecture
Stations of Tsukuba Express
Tsukuba, Ibaraki
Railway stations in Japan opened in 2005